aka Tora-san Finds a Sweetheart, Tora-san Meets the Songstress Again and Torasan: Love Under the Umbrella is a 1975 Japanese comedy film directed by Yoji Yamada. It stars Kiyoshi Atsumi as Torajirō Kuruma (Tora-san), and Ruriko Asaoka as his love interest or "Madonna". Tora-san's Rise and Fall is the fifteenth entry in the popular, long-running Otoko wa Tsurai yo series.

Synopsis
Tora-san meets an old girlfriend on his travels. When she returns home with him, his family attempts to arrange a marriage between the two. After a misunderstanding occurs, the woman leaves, and the family is left regretting that they interfered.

Cast
 Kiyoshi Atsumi as Torajirō
 Chieko Baisho as Sakura
 Ruriko Asaoka as Lily
 Masami Shimojō as Kuruma Tatsuzō
 Gin Maeda as Hiroshi Suwa
 Chieko Misaki as Tsune Kuruma (Torajiro's aunt)
 Hisao Dazai as Manager
 Gajirō Satō as Genkō
 Hayato Nakamura as Mitsuo Suwa
 Yoshio Yoshida as Slave trader
 Tsunehiko Kamijō as Pirate
 Masakane Yonekura as Pirate

Critical appraisal
At the Blue Ribbon Awards, Ruriko Asaoka was given the Best Actress prize and Chieko Baisho the Best Supporting Actress prize for their roles in Tora-san's Rise and Fall. Asaoka was also named Best Actress at the Kinema Junpo Awards and the Mainichi Film Awards. Mainichi also awarded Kiminobu Satō for Best Art Direction on this film and on Harakara. The German-language site molodezhnaja gives Tora-san's Rise and Fall three and a half out of five stars.

Availability
Tora-san's Rise and Fall was released theatrically on August 2, 1975. In Japan, the film was released on videotape in 1995, and in DVD format in 2005 and 2008.

References

Bibliography

English

German

Japanese

External links
 Tora-san's Rise and Fall at www.tora-san.jp (official site)
 Trailer with English subtitles

1975 films
Films directed by Yoji Yamada
1975 comedy films
1970s Japanese-language films
Otoko wa Tsurai yo films
Japanese sequel films
Shochiku films
Films with screenplays by Yôji Yamada
Films set in Aomori Prefecture
Films set in Hakodate
Films set in Otaru
1970s Japanese films